Phee Jinq En (born 29 November 1997) is a Malaysian swimmer. She competed at the 2016 Summer Olympics in the women's 100 metre breaststroke; her time of 1:10.22 in the heats did not qualify her for the semifinals. She also completed at the 2020 Summer Olympics in the women's 100 metre breaststroke and women's 200 metre breaststroke, capture a time of 1:08.40 (rank: 29) and 2:32.57 (rank: 31) respectively. Phee is also a current Malaysian swimming national record holder in both women's 50m and 100m breaststroke.

References

1997 births
Living people
Malaysian people of Chinese descent
Malaysian female breaststroke swimmers
Olympic swimmers of Malaysia
Swimmers at the 2016 Summer Olympics
Swimmers at the 2020 Summer Olympics
Southeast Asian Games medalists in swimming
Southeast Asian Games gold medalists for Malaysia
Southeast Asian Games silver medalists for Malaysia
Swimmers at the 2018 Asian Games
Competitors at the 2015 Southeast Asian Games
Competitors at the 2017 Southeast Asian Games
Competitors at the 2019 Southeast Asian Games
Asian Games competitors for Malaysia
Female breaststroke swimmers
Purdue Boilermakers women's swimmers
People from Petaling District
Swimmers at the 2022 Commonwealth Games
Commonwealth Games competitors for Malaysia
21st-century Malaysian women